AE2 may refer to:

 , E-class submarine of the Royal Australian Navy
 Aero Ae 02, a design of Czechoslovakian plane
 Anion Exchanger 2, transport protein
 Ape Escape 2
 A size designation for Constantinian bronze coins
 Applied Energistics 2, a popular mod for the video game Minecraft
 Aminoestradiol, a synthetic estrogen